The 1921 Wimbledon Championships took place on the outdoor grass courts at the All England Lawn Tennis and Croquet Club in Wimbledon, London, United Kingdom. The tournament ran from 20 June until 2 July. It was the 41st staging of the Wimbledon Championships, and the first Grand Slam tennis event of 1921.

It was the last Wimbledon Championships held at the original Worple Road location and it was also the last time the challenge round system was used at Wimbledon. From 1922 onward the reigning champion would no longer play a single match, the Challenge Round, against the winner of the all-comers tournament to decide the championship but, like every other player, would have to play from the beginning of the tournament.

Finals

Men's singles

 Bill Tilden defeated  Brian Norton, 4–6, 2–6, 6–1, 6–0, 7–5

Women's singles

 Suzanne Lenglen defeated  Elizabeth Ryan, 6–2, 6–0

Men's doubles

 Randolph Lycett /  Max Woosnam defeated  Arthur Lowe /  Gordon Lowe, 6–3, 6–0, 7–5

Women's doubles

 Suzanne Lenglen /  Elizabeth Ryan defeated  Winifred Beamish /  Irene Peacock, 6–1, 6–2

Mixed doubles

 Randolph Lycett /  Elizabeth Ryan defeated  Max Woosnam /  Phyllis Howkins, 6–3, 6–1

References

External links
 Official Wimbledon Championships website

 
Wimbledon Championships
Wimbledon Championships
Wimbledon Championships
Wimbledon Championships